Podothrips is a genus of thrips in the family Phlaeothripidae.

Species
 Podothrips anomalus
 Podothrips ardis
 Podothrips australis
 Podothrips bambusae
 Podothrips barrowi
 Podothrips bellatulus
 Podothrips bicolor
 Podothrips brasiliensis
 Podothrips canizoi
 Podothrips denticeps
 Podothrips distinctus
 Podothrips erami
 Podothrips ferrugineus
 Podothrips graminum
 Podothrips longiceps
 Podothrips lucasseni
 Podothrips luteus
 Podothrips moultoni
 Podothrips moundi
 Podothrips odonaspicola
 Podothrips orarius
 Podothrips orion
 Podothrips placitus
 Podothrips regina
 Podothrips ritchiei
 Podothrips sasacola
 Podothrips scitulus
 Podothrips semiflavus
 Podothrips turangi
 Podothrips websteri
 Podothrips xanthopus

References

Phlaeothripidae
Thrips
Thrips genera